Sonal Phadke (born 9 June 1982) is an Indian former tennis player.

Phadke has a career-high singles ranking by the Women's Tennis Association (WTA) of 427, reached on 16 April 2001. She also has a career-high WTA doubles ranking of 413, achieved August 2001. Phadke won seven singles and two doubles titles on the ITF Women's Circuit.

Playing for India Fed Cup team, Phadke has a win–loss record of 0–2.

ITF finals

Singles (7–4)

Doubles (2–8)

References

External links
 
 
 

1982 births
Living people
Indian female tennis players
Racket sportspeople from Mumbai